Fleming Field may refer to:

Fleming Field (England), a village in County Durham, England, United Kingdom
Fleming Field (Yonkers), a baseball stadium in Yonkers, New York, United States
Fleming Field (Gainesville), the original home field of the University of Florida's football team
 South St. Paul Municipal Airport, also known as Fleming Field